The Sony Ericsson T700 was introduced in 2008 as a mid-range mobile phone. It is in color combinations of "Black on Silver", "Black on Red" and "Shining Silver".

References

External links
 Sony Ericsson T700 Official Website

Mobile phones introduced in 2008
T700